Saint-Félicien (Vivaro-Alpine: Sant Farcian) is a commune in the Ardèche department in southern France.

Population

Personalities linked to Saint-Félicien 
 Marie-France Banc (1876 - 1965), Righteous Among the Nations. Under the name Sister Mary of the Angels, Mother Superior Banc ran the two boarding houses in Saint-Félicien during World War II and protected two Jewish children for two years. She died in Saint-Félicien in 1965.

See also
Communes of the Ardèche department

References

Communes of Ardèche
Ardèche communes articles needing translation from French Wikipedia